Bernhard Kellerhoff (21 March 1900 – 22 October 1978) was a German footballer. He played club football with Schwarz-Weiß Essen and Eintracht Frankfurt. 

Schwarz-Weiß Essen academy product Bernhard Kellerhoff rose through the ranks of the West German team and reached championship play-offs 1925 where Essen were eliminated by FSV Frankfurt. In April 1926 Eintracht Frankfurt signed the left winger. In the 1929–30 he was banned for two months after slapping an opponent player during a tough match with SpVgg Griesheim 02. This ban meant that he missed Eintracht's South German championship run in 1930. A heavy knee injury during an encounter against Mainz sidelined him for good that meant a timely career end.

Despite being presumed to be one of the best left wingers of his time he was never called up for the national team. A football magazine reckoned that his exaggerated dribbling might have played a role in this. However, he was called up to the West and South German regional selections.

Kellerhoff worked as a tie merchant.

Honours 

 Bezirksliga Main-Hessen:
 Champion: 1927–28, 1928–29, 1929–30, 1930–31, 1931–32

 Southern German Championship
 Champion: 1929–30, 1931–32
 Runner-up: 1927–28, 1930–31

 German Championship
 Runner-up: 1932

References
General references

External links
 Bernhard Kellerhoff at eintracht-archiv.de

1900 births
1978 deaths
German footballers
German football managers
Schwarz-Weiß Essen players
Eintracht Frankfurt players
Eintracht Frankfurt managers
Association football forwards